Frederick N. Ward (July 16, 1935 – July 19, 2016) was an American photojournalist whose work has appeared in many major international publications, and is on display in the Metropolitan Museum of Art, the Library of Congress, the International Center of Photography, and the Voyager spacecraft.

History 
Ward was born in Huntsville, Alabama and at age 13 left with his family for Miami, Florida, where his hobby of photography was encouraged by his teacher at Coral Gables Senior High School. In his second year of college, he had work experience at the Miami Daily News, where he met Charlotte. They studied together at the University of Florida. They married. She became a teacher. They learned SCUBA diving at Ginnie Springs, where he experimented with underwater photography.

In 1990, he observed coral bleaching in the Gulf of Mexico, and considered it a greater problem than was portrayed in an article he read in National Geographic.

He produced a book on home birthing. He developed an interest in gemstones, and published several books on the subject. He qualified by completing a Graduate Gemology certificate with the Gemological Institute of America.

He died as a result of Alzheimer’s disease.

References 

1935 births
2016 deaths
People from Huntsville, Alabama
American photojournalists
University of Florida alumni
gemologists
Underwater photographers
Deaths from Alzheimer's disease
Deaths from dementia in California